Quesnelia kautskyi is a species of flowering plant in the family Bromeliaceae, endemic to Brazil (the states of Espírito Santo and Minas Gerais). It was first described in 1999. It is found in the Atlantic Forest ecoregion of southeastern Brazil.

See also

References

kautskyi
Endemic flora of Brazil
Flora of the Atlantic Forest
Flora of Espírito Santo
Flora of Minas Gerais
Plants described in 1999